Queen of the South Football Club is a Scottish professional football club formed in 1919 in Dumfries. The club plays in Scottish League One, the third tier of Scottish football. They are traditionally nicknamed the Doonhamers but are more usually referred to as Queens or QOS. Their home ground is Palmerston Park.

The club won the Division B Championship in 1950–51, the Second Division Championship in 2001–02 and 2012–13, and the Scottish Challenge Cup in 2002–03 and 2012–13. Queens led Scotland's top division until New Year in the 1953–54 season: their highest finish in Scotland's top division was fourth in 1933–34. The club reached their first major cup final in 2008 when they reached the final of the Scottish Cup, where they were runners-up to Rangers. The club's manager is Marvin Bartley.

History

Stadium

Palmerston Park is located on Terregles Street in Dumfries. The club has played there since 1919. South of Scotland League club Heston Rovers have shared Palmerston since 2013.

Supporters and culture
Robbie Neilson, the current manager of Hearts, said about Queens from his loan period at the club in 2002: "It's a well-run club and a real family club with a good spirit about the place."

Marc Horne wrote in The Scotsman following Queens appearance in the 2008 Scottish Cup Final: "In the Palmerston Park club's songbook, it is clear there is no room for songs which feature religion, violent vendettas or centuries-old battles that took place in other lands."

In the 2008 UEFA Cup qualifying trip to Denmark Queen of the South fans were hailed as "a great credit both to their club and to Scotland" by Danish police. About 850 supporters of the Dumfries club travelled to Denmark to watch the UEFA Cup clash with FC Nordsjælland. Even though their team was eliminated, local police said their behaviour was impressive. Insp. Rune Hamann said: "It was a pleasure hosting such a visit by Queen of the South whose supporters were extremely well behaved and a great credit both to their club and to Scotland. Copenhagen was particularly busy in the build up to and after the match with a carnival, party atmosphere being evident. I look forward to welcoming Queen of the South and their terrific supporters back in Denmark in the future."

Ch Insp Mickey Collins from Dumfries and Galloway Constabulary said the fans were a "pleasure to work along with". He added: "Despite the huge numbers of supporters who travelled to Denmark there were no arrests, incidents or issues of any concern. Great praise should be passed on to those fortunate enough to be at the match."

A notable Queen of the South supporter is the DJ and producer Calvin Harris, who grew up in Dumfries. He considered writing a song to celebrate the team reaching the 2008 Scottish Cup Final, but the idea was scrapped due to the time constraints of recording his 2009 album Ready for the Weekend.

Bill Drummond, musician, producer, and former member of The KLF, is a supporter as well due to their proximity to his hometown of Newton Stewart.

Mascot

The club mascot is 'Dougie Doonhamer', a human-sized border collie dog. The character has been played for many years by local supermarket worker Brian Harkness.

On 25 August 2017, Dougie Doonhamer won the Ladbrokes SPFL mascot race at Hamilton Park, having been runner-up the previous year.

On 31 August 2018, Dougie Doonhamer won the Ladbrokes SPFL mascot race at Hamilton Park for the second consecutive year.

Biblical references
Queen of the South are often humorously cited as the only league club in the United Kingdom to be mentioned in the Bible. Luke 11:31 states "The Queen of the South shall rise up at the judgment with the men of this generation and condemn them..." Queen of the South is similarly quoted under Matthew 12:42. In the biblical quote the "Queen of the South" is considered to be the Queen of Sheba. In 2005, the issue was investigated by The Guardian website in their series "The Knowledge", which also found full references to Arsenal, Bury and Reading, as well as partial references to "hearts", "wolves", "forest", "hammer", "spurs" and "man's field".

Anthem
"The Only Team in the Bible" by Neil Grant is always played at Palmerston Park before the teams appear from the tunnel. During August 2019, in an edition of the BBC's popular Off the Ball, Stuart Cosgrove and Tam Cowan challenged the songwriter to recreate the song and it has since become a hit with the club's supporters.

Honours
National League Competitions 
Division 2 – Champions 1950–51, 2001–02, 2012–13; Runners-up 1932–33, 1961–62, 1974–75, 1980–81, 1985–86

Division 3 – Runners-up 1924–25

National Cup Competitions 

Scottish League Challenge Cup – Winners 2002–03, 2012–13; Runners-up 1997–98, 2010–11

Scottish Qualifying Cup – Winners 1923–24

Scottish Cup – Runners-up 2007–08

B.P. Youth Cup –
Runners-up 1985–86

Invitational Tournaments

1936 Algiers Invitational Tournament – Winners

Border Cup – Winners 1991–92, 1992–93

Scottish Brewers Cup – Winners 2000–01, 2001–02, 2006–07

Regional League Competitions 

Scottish League South and West (Wartime League) – Runners-up 1939–40

Western League – Champions 1922–23

Southern Counties League – Winners 1996–97

Regional Cup Competitions (Competed for and won by the reserve team)

Southern Counties Charity Cup – Winners 1920–24, 1926, 1930–32, 1934, 1937

Southern Counties Cup – Winners 1921, 1924, 1935, 1936, 1962, 1966, 1972, 1976, 1982, 1983, 1987, 1988, 1991, 1997, 2003, 2004

Southern Counties League Cup – Winners 1996–97

Southern Counties Consolation Cup – Winners 1922

Potts Cup – Winners 1921, 1960, 1961

Individual Awards

PFA Scotland Manager of the Year Award – Allan Johnston 2012–13

PFA Second Division Player of the Year Award –
Jimmy Robertson 1980–81, Andy Thomson 1991–92, 1993–94, John O'Neill 2001–02, Nicky Clark 2012–13

Bell's SFL Fan of the Season Award – Ian Black 2003–04

SFL Phenomenal Achievement Awards

Recognition of Queens' remarkable Scottish Cup run – Gordon Chisholm 2007–08

Second Division Player of the Year Award – Nicky Clark 2012–13

SFL Goalkeeper of the Season Award – Lee Robinson 2012–13

SFL Second Division Manager of the Year Award – John Connolly 2001–02, Allan Johnston 2012–13

Ginger Boot Award – Nicky Clark 2012–13

Bell's SFL Angels Award – 2003–04

SFL Team of the Season Award – 2012–13

Records

Record victory: 11–1 versus Stranraer; Scottish Cup; 16 January 1932 10–0 versus Bo'ness; Division Two; 1 October 1932  This match was later declared void after Bo'ness were expelled from Scottish League football.

Record defeat: 10-2 versus Dundee at Dens Park; Scottish First Division; 1 December 1962. Queens played for 78 minutes with 10 men after goalkeeper George Farm was injured in the 12th minute and was carried off. Dundee's Alan Gilzean scored 7 of the goals. Dundee were the reigning Division One Champions and would make the European Cup semi-finals that season where they lost to the eventual winners AC Milan.

Record home attendance: 26,552 versus Heart of Midlothian; Scottish Cup 3rd Round; 23 February 1952; Queens 1 Hearts 3

Record home league attendance: 21,142 versus Rangers; 6 October 1962; Queens 0 Rangers 4

Record attendance (any venue): 58,975; 5 April 1950; Hampden Park; 3–0 Scottish Cup semi-final replay defeat to Rangers; 52,924 watched the 1–1 draw with Rangers four days earlier, also at Hampden Park.

Most league points (2 points for a win system): 55; Scottish Division 2; 1985–86

Most league points (3 points for a win system): 92; Scottish Division 2; 2012–13

First ever Scottish League Match under floodlights: Rangers versus Queen of the South; Ibrox Park; 7 March 1956; Rangers 8 Queens 0; Rangers player Don Kitchenbrand scored five goals in this match.

To mark the occasion Preston North End sent a team north for a friendly match.

Highest terrace in Scottish football: Following the trend towards all seater stadia, the height differential between the lowest and highest step on the Portland Drive terrace, records this as the highest remaining terrace in Scottish football.

Individuals
As of 18 March 2023

Longest serving player: Iain McChesney – 1960 to 1981 (615 appearances and scored 79 goals)

Record league scorer in a season: Alexander "Jimmy" Gray – 37 goals in the 1927-28 season

Record scorer (all competitions) in a season: Stephen Dobbie - 43 goals in the 2018-19 season

Most capped player: Billy Houliston (3 caps; 1948–49 season; 3–2 v Northern Ireland at Hampden (scoring two goals on his debut in the 30th & 89th minute), 3–1 v England at Wembley and 2–0 v France at Hampden.

First Queens players to earn four senior Scottish football medals while playing for the club: Jim Thomson and Andy Aitken (winners of the 2001–02 Second Division and 2002–03 Scottish Challenge Cup; runners up in the 1997–98 Scottish Challenge Cup and 2007–08 Scottish Cup).

Most decorated Queens player with four winners medals: Derek Lyle (2001–02 & 2012–13 Second Division; 2002–03 & 2012–13 Scottish Challenge Cup)

Record transfer fee received: Andy Thomson; £250,000; Southend United; 1994

Fastest hat-trick: Tommy Bryce; 1 minute 46 seconds Guinness World Records in the 6–0 win versus Arbroath on 18 December 1993. Bryce's hat-trick was recorded in the 8th, 9th & 10th minutes by the match referee Louis Thow. Bryce also scored a fourth goal in this match.

Longest distance goal by an outfield player: Ryan McCann –  in the Scottish Cup Quarter Final 2–0 win versus Dundee on 8 March 2008.

First player to collect the complete set of four senior Scottish football winners medals: Andy Goram when he played in the 2002–03 Scottish Challenge Cup Final 2–0 win for Queens versus Brechin City, to add to his medals haul gathered elsewhere.

Oldest player to play for the club: Ally MacLeod versus St Mirren in the Reserve League West in April 1992. With Queens short of players the manager named himself as a trialist and played the whole 90 minutes. During the second half Queens were awarded a penalty and the former Scotland manager converted the spot kick. The final score was 7–1 to St Mirren and MacLeod received a standing ovation from the small crowd at the end of the game. MacLeod was 61 years old at the time.

European record
UEFA Cup/Europa League:

Players

Current squad

On loan

For recent transfers, see 2022–23 Queen of the South F.C. season.

Notable players
For all former Queen of the South players with a Wikipedia article, see :Category:Queen of the South F.C. players.

The following players were inducted into Queen of the South's Hall of Fame on 29 October 2011, 19 January 2013 and 24 October 2015 respectively.

The following players were inducted into Queen of the South's Hall of Fame on 23 March 2019.

 

 

 
 

The following players are listed on the club's official website as 'Queens Legends':

Managers

P/C = Player-Coach P/M = Player-Manager

2 Second Spell

Staff

Board of directors
Chairman: Billy Hewitson
Vice-Chairman: Craig Paterson
Director: Mark Blount
Honorary Directors: Norman Blount and Davie Rae

Coaching staff
Manager: Marvin Bartley
Assistant manager: Grant Murray  
First-team goalkeeping coach: Gordon Marshall
Consultant Sport Scientist and Head of Fitness: Robert Kielty
Physiotherapists: Jim Law, Scott Walker
Analyst: Andrew Stephenson
Club doctor: Dr Guy Beaumont
Groundsman: Kevin McCormick
Kitmen: Graeme Dalgleish, Kevin McCormick
Community Development and Commercial Manager: Daniel Armstrong
Head of Youth: Andy Irving
Youth goalkeeping coach: David Byers
Youth coaches: Stuart Douglas, Darren Malin, David Mathieson, Neil Murray, Ross Newlands

References

External links

 
 National Library of Scotland: SCOTTISH SCREEN ARCHIVE (archive films of Queen of the South F.C.)

 
Football clubs in Scotland
Association football clubs established in 1919
Football clubs in Dumfries and Galloway
1919 establishments in Scotland
Scottish Football League teams
Scottish Challenge Cup winners
South of Scotland Football League teams
Scottish Professional Football League teams
Sport in Dumfries